The British composer Geoffrey Bush wrote music across a range of genres, including orchestral, chamber, keyboard, choral works, and a large number of songs. The following is a chronological list of his compositions, from a career that lasted from his student days in the late 1930s until the 1990s.

List of works

Sources

 

 

Bush, Geoffrey